Beachwood Canyon may refer to:

 Beachwood Canyon, Los Angeles
 Beachwood Canyon (album), a 2016 album by Jem